Stuck is a 2017 musical drama film directed by Michael Berry, who also wrote the screenplay with Riley Thomas, whose stage musical the film is based on. It stars Giancarlo Esposito, Arden Cho, Amy Madigan, Ashanti, Omar Chaparro and Gerard Canonico.

The film had its world premiere at the Newport Beach Film Festival on April 23, 2017. It was released on April 19, 2019, by Eammon Films.

Premise
Six strangers get stuck together on a stalled subway train in New York City and all of them have a story to tell.

Cast
Giancarlo Esposito as Lloyd
Arden Cho as Alicia
Amy Madigan as Sue
Ashanti as Eve
Omar Chaparro as Ramon
Gerard Canonico as Caleb
 Sienna Luna as Ramon's daughter Mila
 Madison Blas as Ramon's daughter Elena

Production
In July 2014, Giancarlo Esposito, Amy Madigan, and Ashanti joined the cast of the film, with Michael Berry directing from a screenplay he co-wrote with Riley Thomas, who also wrote the play the film is based upon.

Release
The film had its world premiere at the Newport Beach Film Festival on April 23, 2017. It was released on April 19, 2019, by Eammon Films.

References

External links

2010s musical films
American musical drama films
Films based on musicals
Films set in New York City
Films set on the New York City Subway
Films set on trains
2017 independent films
2010s English-language films
2010s American films